Jimmy Jimmy may refer to:

Jimmy Jimmy (band), a British band
Jimmy Jimmy (song), a song by The Undertones
"Jimmy Jimmy", a song by Madonna from the album True Blue
"Jimmy Jimmy Aaja Aaja", a Bollywood song from the film Disco Dancer
"Jimmy" (song), a song by M.I.A.

See also
"Jimmy's Jimmy", 2001 episode of American television sitcom Yes, Dear
Jimmy Two-Shoes, the cartoon for which this is the Italian name
Jimmy (disambiguation)